Live at the Blue Note is a 1990 live album by Oscar Peterson.

Track listing
 Introductions – 1:56
 "Honeysuckle Rose" (Andy Razaf, Fats Waller) – 8:50
 "Let There Be Love" (Lionel Grant, Ian Rand) – 12:00
 "Peace for South Africa" (Oscar Peterson) – 10:46
 "Sushi" (Peterson) – 8:06
 "I Remember You"/"A Child Is Born"/"Tenderly" (Johnny Mercer, Victor Schertzinger)/(Thad Jones, Alec Wilder)/(Walter Gross, Jack Lawrence) – 7:17
 "Sweet Georgia Brown" (Ben Bernie, Maceo Pinkard, Kenneth Casey) – 8:21
 "Blues for Big Scotia" (Peterson) - 6:08

Personnel

Performance
 Oscar Peterson – piano
 Herb Ellis – guitar
 Ray Brown – double bass
 Bobby Durham - drums

Production
 Ray Kirschensteiner - art direction
 Leonard Feather - liner notes
 Kenneth Harmann - engineer
 Jack Renner
 Robert Woods - producer

References

Oscar Peterson live albums
1990 live albums
Telarc Records live albums
Grammy Award for Best Jazz Instrumental Album
Albums recorded at the Blue Note Jazz Club